The women's team competition at the 2014 Asian Games in Incheon was held on 23 September at the Dowon Gymnasium.

Schedule
All times are Korea Standard Time (UTC+09:00)

Results

Bracket

Main

Repechage

Elimination round of 16

Quarterfinals

Semifinals

Final of repechage

Bronze medal contests

Gold medal contest

Non-participating athletes

References

External links
 
 Official website

Wteam
Asian Games 2014
Asian Wteam